Bäsna is a locality situated in Gagnef Municipality, Dalarna County, Sweden, with a population of 665 in 2019. It dates back to the Middle Ages.

References 

Populated places in Dalarna County
Populated places in Gagnef Municipality